Chekin is a Russian masculine surname, its feminine counterpart is Chekina. It may refer to
Alexandra Chekina (born 1993), Russian cyclist 
Leonid S. Chekin, Russian-American writer and translator 
Chekin (Start 2018), UK

Russian-language surnames